Kujō Shunshi (25 June 1209 – 22 October 1233) also known as Sohekimon-in (藻璧門院), was Empress of Japan as the consort of Emperor Go-Horikawa. 

Upon her death, the court women moved her body to a separate room where she was dressed in Buddhist robes, head shaven and juzu placed in her hands.

Children: 

First son: Imperial Prince Mitsuhito (秀仁親王) (Emperor Shijō)
Fourth daughter: Imperial Princess Hoshi (暤子内親王)

Notes

Fujiwara clan
Japanese empresses
Japanese Buddhists
13th-century Buddhists
1209 births
1233 deaths
Deaths in childbirth